Dongwang Tibetan is a Tibetic language of Yunnan, China, once considered a dialect of Khams. It is spoken in the eastern part of Shangri-La County, along the Dongwang River, by about 6,000 people.

References

Bibliography 
Ellen Bartee, 2007. A grammar of Dongwang Tibetan.

Bodic languages
Languages of Yunnan